Seohyeon Station is a subway station on the Bundang Line in Gyeonggi-do, South Korea. The line connects to Seoul. The area around this station is popular among young people, with many bars, restaurants, movie theaters, hagwon, offices, etc. AK Plaza (previously Samsung Plaza) and Bundang Jesaeng Hospital are also in this area.

Seoul Metropolitan Subway stations
Bundang
Railway stations opened in 1994
Metro stations in Seongnam